Marko Nikolić (born 16 June 1998) is a Serbian professional footballer.

Career statistics
.

References

1998 births
Footballers from Belgrade
Living people
Serbian footballers
Association football defenders
FK Zemun players
FK Inđija players
FC Arsenal Kyiv players
FK Rad players
Budafoki LC footballers
Debreceni VSC players
FK Riteriai players
Serbian First League players
Ukrainian Premier League players
Serbian SuperLiga players
Nemzeti Bajnokság I players
A Lyga players
Serbian expatriate footballers
Expatriate footballers in Ukraine
Serbian expatriate sportspeople in Ukraine
Expatriate footballers in Hungary
Serbian expatriate sportspeople in Hungary
Expatriate footballers in Lithuania
Serbian expatriate sportspeople in Lithuania